Melville McKee (born 19 August 1994) is a British racing driver. He currently drives for Bamboo Engineering in the GP3 Series. His grandfather Mike was a Formula Two and 24 Hours of Le Mans racing driver.

Career

Karting
McKee began karting at the age of six, contesting until 2003 in Australian championships. From 2004 to 2009 he competed mostly in various Swiss championships. In 2009 he became runner-up in the Junior class of the Rotax Max Challenge.

Formula Lista Junior
McKee began his formula racing career in 2010 in Formula Lista Junior with Hope Pole Vision Racing. He won races at Most and Hockenheim with another five podiums, finishing the season on the third place in the standings.

Formula Renault
In 2011, McKee graduated to the Formula Renault 2.0 Alps championship, signing with ARTA Engineering. He won race at Spielberg and Imola with podium at Budapest on his way to fourth place and Junior's Championship title. Also he spent four races in Eurocup Formula Renault 2.0 with the same team.

For the next year McKee remained in both series but switched to Interwetten Racing and focused on the Eurocup. His best result was second place at Nürburgring, that brought him eight place in the standings. In Alps championship he had two podiums at Monza and Spielberg.

McKee started his third consecutive season in Eurocup with Manor MP Motorsport.

GP3 Series
McKee will make his GP3 Series debut in 2013, competing for Bamboo Engineering.

Racing record

Career summary

Complete GP3 Series results
(key) (Races in bold indicate pole position) (Races in italics indicate fastest lap)

References

External links

1994 births
Living people
Sportspeople from Singapore
British people of Singaporean descent
Formula Lista Junior drivers
Formula Renault 2.0 Alps drivers
Formula Renault Eurocup drivers
GP3 Series drivers
Manor Motorsport drivers
MP Motorsport drivers
Morand Racing drivers
Craft-Bamboo Racing drivers